Loon Lake is a lake located by Cohocton, New York. Fish species present in the lake include largemouth bass, yellow perch, black bullhead, cisco, rock bass, smallmouth bass, pickerel, brown bullhead, and pumpkinseed sunfish. There is access for fee via boat launch on the west shore off Laf Alot Road. You can also access it by going down Faki Road and getting a paid boat.

References

Lakes of New York (state)
Lakes of Steuben County, New York